Geir Atle Wøien (born 26 September 1975) is a retired Norwegian ski jumper.

In the World Cup he finished once among the top 10, with an eighth place from Predazzo in December 1993.

References

1974 births
Living people
Norwegian male ski jumpers
People from Østfold
Sportspeople from Viken (county)